Miriam Vanessa García Muñoz (born 14 February 1998), known as Miriam García, is a Mexican professional football midfielder who currently plays for Juárez of the Liga MX Femenil, the first professional women's football league in Mexico.
In 2017, she helped Chivas win the first professional women's football championship in the country in front of 32,466 spectators.
 
García represented Mexico on the under-20 national team and helped the team win the 2018 CONCACAF Women's U-20 Championship. She was subsequently named Most Valuable Player (MVP) of the tournament.

Playing career

Club

Guadalajara, 2017– 
García began playing for Guadalajara during the inaugural season of Liga MX Femenil.

International
García has represented Mexico on the under-17 and under-20 national teams. In January 2018, she was named the winner of the Golden Ball (best player) award at the CONCACAF Women's U-20 Championship.  She played every minute of every match for Mexico's winning team.

Honors and awards

Club
Guadalajara
 Liga MX Femenil: Apertura 2017

Individual
 Liga MX Femenil Team of The Season: Apertura 2017

International
Mexico U17
 CONCACAF Women's U-17 Championship: 2013

Mexico U20
 CONCACAF Women's U-20 Championship: 2018  
 2018 CONCACAF Women's U-20 Championship Golden Ball award

References

External links
 
 Miriam García at C.D. Guadalajara Femenil 
 

1998 births
Living people
Mexican women's footballers
Footballers from Guadalajara, Jalisco
Liga MX Femenil players
C.D. Guadalajara (women) footballers
Women's association football midfielders
Mexican footballers